Aami sei Meye ( I am that girl) is a 1998 Bengali film directed by Prosenjit Chatterjee this is 2nd directorial film of Prosenjit Chatterjee under the banner of Dhanuka Brothers Pvt. Ltd. The film features actors Prosenjit Chatterjee, Rituparna Sengupta, Ranjit Mallick, Abhishek Chatterjee, Alamgir in the lead roles. Famous Tollywood (Telugu) and Bollywood actress Jaya Prada made her debut in Bengali movies with this. Music of the film has been composed by Tabun Sutradhar. Sung by Udit Narayan, Kumar Sanu and Kavita Krishnamurti

Cast 
 Jaya Prada
 Alamgir
 Ranjit Mallick
 Prosenjit Chatterjee
 Rituparna Sengupta
 Abhishek Chatterjee
 Sanghamitra Bandyopadhyay
 Asrani
 Shahin Alam

Music
The film's music was composed by Tabun Satradhar. It contained the chartbuster "Aguner Din Sesh Hobe Ekdin", sung by Kumar Sanu and Kavita Krishnamurthy.

References

External links
 Aami Sei Meye at the Gomolo
 Induna.com

1998 films
Bengali-language Indian films
Bengali-language Bangladeshi films
1990s Bengali-language films